The Coronado 35 is an American sailboat that was designed by William H. Tripp Jr. as a cruiser and first built in 1971.

The Coronado 35 design was developed into the Portman 36 in 1978 and later into the Watkins 36 and the Watkins 36C.

Development
The Coronado 35's hull is mostly likely derived from the moulds used for the 1970 vintage, Tripp-designed Columbia 34 Mark II, which were also used for the Hughes 36 and the Hughes-Columbia 36.

Production
The design was built by Coronado Yachts in the United States between 1971 and 1976, but it is now out of production.

Design
The Coronado 35 is a recreational keelboat, built predominantly of fiberglass, with wood trim. It has a center-cockpit ketch rig or an optional masthead sloop rig, a spooned raked stem, a raised transom, a skeg-mounted rudder controlled by a wheel and a fixed fin keel. It displaces  and carries  of ballast.

The boat is fitted with a Palmer P-60 gasoline engine for docking and maneuvering.

Variants
Coronado 35
Coronado 35 MS

See also
List of sailing boat types

Related development
Hughes 36
Hughes-Columbia 36
Portman 36
Watkins 36
Watkins 36C

Similar sailboats
Bayfield 36
Beneteau 361
C&C 36-1
C&C 36R
Catalina 36
Columbia 36
CS 36
Ericson 36
Frigate 36
Hunter 36
Hunter 36-2
Hunter 36 Legend
Hunter 36 Vision
Invader 36
Islander 36
Nonsuch 36
S2 11.0
Seidelmann 37

References

External links

Keelboats
1970s sailboat type designs
Sailing yachts
Sailboat type designs by William H. Tripp Jr.
Sailboat types built by Coronado Yachts